George Gummer (birth unknown – death unknown) was a Welsh professional rugby league footballer who played in the 1930s and 1940s. He also appeared for Wigan as a World War II guest player (Heritage № 489).

International honours
George Gummer won caps for Wales while at Barrow 1936 2-caps.

References

External links
Statistics at orl-heritagetrust.org.uk
(archived by web.archive.org) Man with the heart of an Ox
Statistics at wigan.rlfans.com

Barrow Raiders players
Oldham R.L.F.C. players
Place of birth missing
Place of death missing
Rochdale Hornets captains
Rochdale Hornets players
Rugby league centres
Wales national rugby league team players
Welsh rugby league players
Wigan Warriors wartime guest players
Year of birth missing
Year of death missing